The 2022 Southland Conference women's basketball tournament was the postseason women's basketball tournament for the 2021–22 season in the Southland Conference. The tournament took place March 10–13, 2022. The tournament winner received an automatic invitation to the 2022 NCAA Division I women’s basketball tournament.

Seeds 
Teams were seeded by record within the conference, with a tie-breaker system to seed teams with identical conference records. All eight teams in the conference qualified for the tournament. The top two seeds received double byes into the semifinals in the merit-based format. The No. 3 and No. 4 seeds received single byes to the quarterfinals. Tiebreakers used are 1) Head-to-head results, 2) comparison of records against individual teams in the conference starting with the top-ranked team(s) and working down and 3) NCAA NET rankings available on the day following the conclusion of regular-season play.

Schedule

Bracket

* denotes number of overtime periods

References 

2021–22 Southland Conference women's basketball season
Southland Conference
Southland Conference women's basketball tournament